Hymenocaris is a genus of Cambrian crustaceans.

Taxonomy
Some species originally assigned to Hymenocaris were later transferred to Canadaspis, such as Canadaspis perfecta (Hymenocaris perfecta), leaving only Hymenocaris vermicauda. Differences between Hymenocaris and Canadaspis have been used to justify erecting a separate family, Hymenocarididae and order, Hymenostraca for Hymenocaris, although it is also sometimes placed in the family Canadaspididae and the order Canadaspidida.

References

Prehistoric Malacostraca
Cambrian arthropods
Paleozoic crustaceans
Prehistoric crustacean genera
Burgess Shale fossils
Cambrian genus extinctions